Polyura arja, the pallid nawab, is a butterfly belonging to the rajahs and nawabs group, that is, the Charaxinae subfamily of the brush-footed butterflies family.

Subspecies 
Polyura arja arja

Description

The outer edge of the forewings is concave and the hindwings show two short blue tails. The upperside of the wings is brown with a broad white or anteriorly pale green band from the inner edge of the forewing to the costal edge of the hindwings, one or two small white spots at the apex of the forewings and a continuous row of white or pale yellow spots running along the outer submargin of the hindwings. The underside of the wings is lighter brown with a quite similar pattern. The body is dark brown.

Distribution
This species can be found in north-east India (Sikkim to Assam), Burma, Thailand and Indochina.

See also
List of butterflies of India
List of butterflies of India (Nymphalidae)

Bibliography

References 

Polyura
Butterflies of Asia
Butterflies of Indochina
Taxa named by Baron Cajetan von Felder
Taxa named by Rudolf Felder
Butterflies described in 1867